Frank Nelson Cole (September 20, 1861 – May 26, 1926) was an American mathematician.

Life and works 
Cole was born in Ashland, Massachusetts.  When he was very young, the family moved to Marlborough, Massachusetts where he attended school and graduated from Marlborough High School. He was then educated at Harvard, where he lectured on mathematics from 1885 to 1887.

Later, he was employed at the University of Michigan and Columbia University. Professor Cole became secretary of the American Mathematical Society in 1895 and an editor of its Bulletin in 1897.

Cole published a number of important papers, including The Diurnal Variation of Barometric Pressure (1892). In 1893 in Chicago, his paper On a Certain Simple Group (the group is PSL(2,8)) was read (but not by him) at the International Mathematical Congress held in connection with the World's Columbian Exposition.

On October 31, 1903, Cole famously made a presentation to a meeting of the American Mathematical Society where he identified the factors of the Mersenne number 267 − 1, or M67. Édouard Lucas had demonstrated in 1876 that M67 must have factors (i.e., is not prime), but he was unable to determine what those factors were. During Cole's so-called "lecture", he approached the chalkboard and in complete silence proceeded to calculate the value of M67, with the result being 147,573,952,589,676,412,927. Cole then moved to the other side of the board and wrote 193,707,721 × 761,838,257,287, and worked through the tedious calculations by hand. Upon completing the multiplication and demonstrating that the result equaled M67, Cole returned to his seat, not having uttered a word during the hour-long presentation. His audience greeted the presentation with a standing ovation. Cole later admitted that finding the factors had taken "three years of Sundays".

Cole died alone in New York City, aged 64. The American Mathematical Society's Cole Prize was named in his honor.

Notes

External links 
 
 
 

1861 births
1926 deaths
19th-century American mathematicians
20th-century American mathematicians
Columbia University faculty
Harvard College alumni
People from Ashland, Massachusetts
University of Michigan faculty